Jean Carl Pierre Marie d'Orléans (born 19 May 1965) is the current head of the House of Orléans. Jean is the senior male descendant by primogeniture in the male-line of Louis-Philippe I, King of the French, and thus, according to the Orléanists, the legitimate claimant to the throne of France as Jean IV. Of France's three monarchist movements, Orléanism, Legitimism and Bonapartism, most royalists are Orléanists. Jean is the second son of the late Henri, Count of Paris (1933–2019) and his former wife Duchess Marie-Thérèse of Württemberg (b. 1934). With the death of his father, he has been using the style of Count of Paris since 2019.

Biography

Early life and education
Jean d'Orléans was born on 19 May 1965 in Boulogne-Billancourt, the son of Henri of Orleans and Maria Theresa of Württemberg. He was baptized in the Catholic Church on 14 June 1965 in the Royal Chapel of Dreux. He received as godfather, his maternal uncle, Carl of Württemberg, and as godmother, his paternal aunt, Princess Chantal of Orleans.

After attending the Passy-Saint-Nicolas-Buzenval, a private Catholic secondary school, he attended the Sorbonne, where he obtained a master's degree in philosophy in 1989. In 1992, he earned a master's degree in law from the Free Faculty of Law, Economics and Management of Paris. In 1994, he earned a Master of Business Administration (MBA) from Azusa Pacific University in Los Angeles, California.

Jean completed his national service as an officer, first taking four months of classes at the École de cavalerie in Saumur. He was assigned as an officer aspirant, and then as a second lieutenant, and has been a reserve colonel of the French Army since January 2015.

After finishing his military duties, he began to work as a consultant at Lazard, then as a financial consultant at Deloitte, followed by working as a project manager at the Groupe Banque Populaire.

Jean is multilingual, speaking French, English, and German.

First engagement
Prince Jean was due to marry Duchess Tatjana of Oldenburg (b. 1974) in 2001. Duchess Tatjana is the youngest daughter of Duke Johann of Oldenburg (b. 1940) and his wife, Countess Ilka of Ortenburg (b. 1942). Her elder sister Eilika married Archduke Georg of Austria in 1997. However, the wedding was cancelled at the last moment because of a dispute over religious denomination: Jean's father, Henri, feared the Orléans claim to the throne would be compromised if there were to be a Protestant heir.

Second engagement and marriage
On 29 November 2008, Henri,then Count of Paris, announced the engagement of Jean, the then Duke of Vendôme, to Maria Magdalena Philomena Juliana Johanna de Tornos y Steinhart, born in Vienna on 19 June 1977. The pair are distantly related, as both are descendants of Count Jaroslav Bořita of Martinice and his first wife, Eusebia von Sternberg (1584–1634). The civil wedding, conducted by Mayor Rachida Dati, took place on 19 March 2009 in Paris. The religious wedding was held on 2 May 2009 at the Cathédrale Notre-Dame at Senlis, with a reception at the Château de Chantilly. The bride wore a gown by Christian Lacroix and a jacket embroidered by Maison Lesage.

Lawsuit
In 2021, Jean filed a lawsuit against the Saint-Louis foundation, demanding €1 million in damages and the return of five properties, including the Château d'Amboise. In 1886, the château was bequeathed to the Institute of France by Jean's ancestor Henri d’Orléans, with the caveat that the property would never be altered by the institute. The Saint-Louis foundation was later founded by Jean's grandfather, Henri VI, Count of Paris, in 1974. Jean's lawsuit alleges that the Institute violated their contract to never alter the property, after they announced plans to transform the Pavillon d’Enghien into a €760-a-night luxury hotel, containing a spa and gastronomic restaurant. Jean had previously lived in the château from 2001 to September 2021 rent-free, but was forcefully evicted by the institute after they began to demand he pay rent, which Jean viewed as a violation of their contract.

Family
Jean and his wife Philomena have five children:  
 Prince Gaston Louis Antoine Marie d'Orléans (born 19 November 2009 in Paris).
 Princess Antoinette Léopoldine Jeanne Marie d'Orléans (born 28 January 2012 in Vienna).
 Princess Louise-Marguerite Eléonore Marie d'Orléans (born 30 July 2014 in Poissy).
 Prince Joseph Gabriel David Marie d'Orléans (born 2 June 2016).
 Princess Jacinthe Élisabeth-Charlotte Marie d'Orléans (born 9 October 2018 in Dreux).

Politics
Jean believes that the people of France are "monarchist at heart" and argues that they long for a non-partisan figurehead. He has spoken in support of the Yellow vests protests in France. Jean has also expressed his opposition to same-sex marriage, having participated in the  protests, as well as abortion.

In May 2019, Jean met with French President Emmanuel Macron, Brigitte Macron, and Italian President Sergio Mattarella in his then-home in the Château d'Amboise.

Titles, styles and honours

Titles in pretense
19 May 1965 – 27 September 1987: His Royal Highness Prince Jean d'Orléans, 
27 September 1987 – 21 January 2019: His Royal Highness Prince Jean d'Orléans, Duke of Vendôme
21 January 2019 – present:  The Count of Paris

He was created Duke of Vendôme by his paternal grandfather, on 27 September 1987.

Following the death of his father, it was initially thought that Prince Jean would not assume the title of Count of Paris for several months after his father's death, and possibly not for as much as one year.

Honours

National
 : Recipient of the National Defence Medal, 3rd Class

Dynastic
  Portuguese Royal Family: Knight Grand Cross of the Order of the Immaculate Conception of Vila Viçosa (19 February 2000)
  House of Bourbon-Two Sicilies Royal Family:
 Knight of the Illustrious Royal Order of Saint Januarius (19 March 2019, installed 13 May 2019)
 Knight Grand Cross of Justice of the Sacred Military Constantinian Order of Saint George (22 November 2009, installed 30 May 2011), Bailiff Knight Grand Cross of Justice with Collar (19 March 2019, installed 13 May 2019)

Ancestry
Jean is a direct male-line descendant of Louis Philippe I, the last French king, who in turn was a descendant of Philippe I, Duke of Orléans, the younger brother of Louis XIV of France. Jean is also descended from Charles X of France, brother of Louis XVI; and the Bourbons of Spain, the Two Sicilies and Parma.

References

External links
 Official website 
 Duke of Vendôme Jean d'Orléans stakes his claim to French throne, The Times, 10 October 2009.

1965 births
Living people
Counts of Paris
Princes of France (Orléans)
Dukes of Vendôme
Orléanist pretenders to the French throne
Knights Grand Cross of the Order of the Immaculate Conception of Vila Viçosa